Gavin Marguerite (born 12 August 1995) is a French professional rugby league footballer who plays as a  and er for the Villeneuve Leopards in the Elite One Championship

He previously played for Toulouse Olympique in the Betfred Championship and the Catalans Dragons in the Super League.

He has exceptional pace and scored two tries in the clubs return to the English Leagues against Batley Bulldogs in 2017.

Playing career

Catalans Dragons
After leaving Toulouse at the end of 2019, he signed for Super League side Catalans Dragons ahead of the 2020 season.

Ottawa Aces
On 15 Aug 2020 it was reported that he had signed for Ottawa Aces in the RFL League 1
, however COVID-19 delayed their entry into League 1 until 2022.

Villeneuve XIII RLLG
On 19 Nov 2020 it was reported that he had signed for Villeneuve XIII RLLG in the Elite One Championship due to the Ottawa Aces situation.

International
He was selected in France 9s squad for the 2019 Rugby League World Cup 9s.

References

External links
 Toulouse Olympique profile

1995 births
Living people
Catalans Dragons players
France national rugby league team players
French rugby league players
Rugby league centres
Rugby league wingers
Toulouse Olympique players
Villeneuve Leopards players